Mark Daniel Gearan (born September 19, 1956) is a public servant, lawyer, higher education expert, and the director of the Harvard Kennedy School Institute of Politics. From 1999 to 2017, Gearan was the president of Hobart and William Smith Colleges in Geneva, New York, the longest serving president in the history of HWS. On March 1, 2018, Gearan became the 19th Director of The Institute of Politics (IOP) at Harvard University.

When he concluded his presidency in 2017, he had served for 18 years, leading the Colleges through a period of unprecedented growth. In recognition of his service, the HWS Board of Trustees awarded Gearan an honorary degree and named him President Emeritus of the Colleges, the first time in HWS history that the board bestowed the honor.

Following his final year at HWS, Gearan joined Harvard University as 'President in Residence' working on important issues facing higher education and the next generation of leaders at the Graduate School of Education. His position at Harvard reflects Gearan's stature in higher education where he has held leadership roles in numerous organizations including chair of National Campus Compact, chair of the Corporation for National and Community Service, chair of the Annapolis Group of selective liberal arts colleges, and chair of the Talloires Network Steering Committee, an international organization of college and university presidents from six continents committed to civic engagement.

Early life and education
Gearan was born in Gardner, Massachusetts and graduated from Gardner High School in 1974. Gearan earned his A.B. in government cum laude at Harvard University in 1978 and his J.D. degree from Georgetown University Law Center in 1991.  At Harvard he was the college roommate of future lawyer and conservative talk show host Hugh Hewitt.  His cousin is Anne Gearan, political correspondent at The Washington Post.

Career in politics and government
Gearan's early interest in politics began when he helped distribute leaflets in Jesuit priest Robert F. Drinan's campaign for Congress on a strong anti-Vietnam War platform in 1970. "As an eighth-grader growing up in Gardner, I had noticed that a Catholic priest was running for Congress amid the political turmoil of the Vietnam era," said Gearan. "From my early days on a bike leafleting the neighborhoods of Gardner, I graduated to driving the congressman," Gearan added. While an undergraduate at Harvard, Gearan interned in Drinan's Washington office and worked on Drinan's re-election campaign in 1978. It was there that Gearan met his future wife, Mary Herlihy, a fellow staffer in Drinan's office.

Gearan worked as a newspaper reporter for the Fitchburg, Massachusetts Sentinel and Enterprise for one year. After leaving the newspaper, Gearan was chief of staff for U.S. Representative Berkley Bedell of Iowa for three years. In 1983, Massachusetts Governor Michael Dukakis appointed Gearan Director of Federal-State Relations for the Commonwealth of Massachusetts, a post he held until 1988 when Gearan joined Dukakis' campaign for the Presidency.

1988 Presidential campaign
When Dukakis ran for the presidency in 1988, Gearan originally had the high-profile job of managing Dukakis' campaign during the crucial Iowa caucuses. When Gary Hart dropped out of the race, the Dukakis campaign replaced Gearan with Hart's Iowa coordinator and sent Gearan back to Boston to be the campaign's national headquarters Press Secretary. Although Gearan was disappointed by the decision, he accepted it. "You know, it's a long life, and there aren't too many other things in politics but loyalty," he said when asked about the incident.

When Bush announced on August 17, 1988 that he was selecting Dan Quayle as his running mate after previously saying he planned to keep his choice secret until later during the convention, Gearan had one of the sharpest comments. "We learned something about George Bush today. He can't keep a secret," said Gearan. "and he can't stand up to the pressure of the right wing." As Dukakis' Press spokesman, Gearan was frustrated by Republican negative campaigning and supported Dukakis' decision to respond. "There comes a time when you respond," said Gearan. "The dogs days of August are over." Gearan added that Bush had falsely accused Dukakis of opposing the Stealth bomber and the D-5, a nuclear missile used on the Trident submarine.

After the election Gearan said that one of the mistakes Dukakis made after winning the Democratic nomination was not re-introducing himself to the American people. "One of the big mistakes we made in 1988 was we assumed people knew who Michael Dukakis was," said Gearan. After Dukakis' defeat, Mr. Gearan returned to run the Massachusetts Office of Federal Relations until 1989. Gearan was Executive Director of the Democratic Governors Association from 1989 to 1992. As executive director of the Democratic Governors Association, Gearan offered George Bush a slogan for his 1992 re-election campaign with a double-entendre: "Bush in '92. You Ain't Seen Nothin' Yet."

1992 Presidential campaign
In 1991 Gearan was offered the job of Clinton's campaign's communications chief while Clinton was seeking the Democratic nomination for president. Gearan was unable to accept because his wife was in a difficult pregnancy that confined her to bed for much of the time. "This was a very exciting time in our lives," Gearan said. "And Mary was quite sick and had left her job. In the beginning stages, it was one of those deals where we weren't sure how it was going to go. I was not able to move to Little Rock and give the 1,000 percent that was required at the time to Governor Clinton, because I was distracted." When Clinton's effort floundered in New Hampshire amid allegations of extramarital affairs and draft dodging, Gearan flew to New Hampshire to help salvage Clinton's candidacy.

After Clinton won the nomination, Gearan became Al Gore's campaign manager during his run for the vice presidency. Gearan's job was to ensure that the message Gore delivered reflected the views and strategies of the head of the ticket. "It is a critical role and needs someone with a lot of skills," said George Stephanopoulos, director of communications for the Clinton campaign. "But he has Clinton's utmost confidence and really gained the respect of Gore and his staff." Gearan had the ability to keep things light during the grueling campaign. Once while accompanying Al Gore during the 1992 campaign Gearan noticed an old piano at his campus residence at the University of Missouri. Gearan is a talented piano player so when told that ragtime music composer Scott Joplin had once played the piano, Gearan sat down and played part of "Maple Leaf Rag." "I'm never washing these hands again," he said.

After the election Gearan was named Deputy Director of the Clinton/Gore Transition Team in 1992 in charge of Washington operations for Transition Director Warren Christopher. "I came back to Washington after working for Michael S. Dukakis in 1988 and I was a knucklehead," said Gearan. "I came back in 1992 and I was a genius. It makes you realize there are centrifugal forces beyond our control. I guess one is always a knucklehead-in-training."

Clinton Administration
During the Clinton Administration Gearan served several roles. He began as White House Deputy Chief of Staff. He was then promoted to Assistant to the President of the United States and Director of Communications and Strategic Planning. Gearan traveled extensively with the president on overseas trips to Russia, Japan, the Middle East, Germany, Italy, and Ireland. Gearan helped shepherd Supreme Court Justice Stephen Breyer through his confirmation hearings in 1994 and said that managing a successful confirmation requires thorough research, an aggressive media strategy, intense lobbying on Capitol Hill and it also helps to expect the unexpected. "There's only so much you can game out," said Gearan.

Peace Corps Director
On June 22, 1995 President Clinton announced his nomination of Gearan to head the Peace Corps. "I am proud to nominate him to lead our Peace Corps into the 21st century, to keep the vision and the spirit of John Kennedy alive and the dream of America alive all over the world," said Clinton.

Controversy over nomination
There was some controversy over Gearan's appointment as Peace Corps Director since he had not served in the Peace Corps himself and was succeeding Carol Bellamy, who was the first Peace Corps Director to have served as a volunteer. The National Peace Corps Association (NPCA), an organization made up of returned volunteers, had urged President Clinton to appoint a former volunteer to the position rather than Gearan. However Gearan was strongly supported by other returned volunteers including Donna Shalala, Clinton's Secretary of Health and Human Services, who had served in the Peace Corps in Iran and who addressed the NPCA at their annual meeting on August 4, 1995 in Austin, Texas. "I want to talk with you about the President's new nominee -- Mark Gearan. I am Mark Gearan's friend. We have worked closely together for the past two and a half years. He is a decent, thoughtful, energetic and caring man," said Shalala. "I strongly support the President's decision to nominate him. He will do a great job for all of us. Please support him," Shalala added.

Accomplishments as Director
Gearan was confirmed by the United States Senate and sworn in as the 14th Director of the Peace Corps in September 1995 was director of the Peace Corps from 1995 to 1999. During Gearan's tenure as Peace Corps Director, the Peace Corps opened programs in South Africa, Jordan, Mozambique and Bangladesh and returned its volunteers to Haiti after a five-year absence. On March 1, 1996, the 35th anniversary of the founding of the Peace Corps, Gearan spoke about its relevance today: "You answered President Kennedy's call, 'Ask not what your country can do for you, ask what you can do for your country.' You provided needed assistance to 130 countries around the globe, and you continue that service here at home."

On June 29, 1998, the United States and China formalized the Peace Corps program in China signing an agreement that established a formal framework for a Peace Corps program in China. Twenty-one volunteers arrived to begin their assignments in Sichuan province, where the Peace Corps has operated on a pilot basis since 1993. President Clinton, in China for a state visit said "This agreement represents an important step forward in building the bonds of friendship between the American and Chinese people. As in the other 80 countries where they work, Peace Corps Volunteers in China reflect the finest traditions of Americans' idealism and pragmatic approach to assisting others."

Crisis Corps
One of Gearan's most successful initiatives was the creation of the Crisis Corps, that would send former Peace Corps volunteers into crisis areas for six months or less to help during emergencies. However Gearan later regretted that he had not moved faster in creating the corps. "I lost time and ground because I sought a broad range of opinions for starting the Crisis Corps even though I knew it was a good idea. Today it exists -- and it is one of my proudest achievements."

Plan to expand the Peace Corps
On January 3, 1998, President Clinton proposed to expand the Peace Corps from about 6,500 volunteers to 10,000 volunteers by the year 2000. "President Clinton's initiative to put the Peace Corps on the path to have 10,000 volunteers serving overseas by the year 2000 is one of the most important developments in the history of the Peace Corps," Gearan said. "The President's initiative would result in a 50 percent increase in the number of Peace Corps volunteers. This is a strong affirmation of the contributions of 6,500 volunteers currently serving in 85 countries, as well as the work of more than 150,000 Americans who have joined the Peace Corps since 1961." However the initiative failed to gain political traction or substantially increased funding in Congress and by the end of Clinton's term in office, the number of volunteers had made only modest gains increasing to about 7,100.

College President
On June 1, 1999, President Clinton announced that Gearan would be leaving the administration to accept the position of President of Hobart and William Smith Colleges in Geneva, New York. "One of the best personnel decisions I have made as President was to appoint Mark Gearan as the Director of the Peace Corps," Clinton said. "I believe he has been one of the most successful Directors since President Kennedy established the Peace Corps in 1961. He has rejuvenated the Peace Corps, and demonstrated a deep commitment to its legacy of service and the women and men who serve as Peace Corps volunteers. He can be proud that the Peace Corps will soon have more volunteers serving overseas than at any time in a generation."

Gearan explained why he left government to come to Hobart and William Smith. "College administration generally and, in particular, small, residential, liberal arts colleges have always been things I thought I would like to be a part of, because of their importance, because they are mission-oriented, because they are value-centered," Gearan said. "I came up here and was enormously impressed with the students and their capacity and their love for the place and their yearning for learning," Gearan added. Under Gearan's leadership, Hobart and William Smith expanded its academic reach and advanced its reputation as a prominent liberal arts institution. By strengthening the Colleges' financial resources and increasing its fundraising range, Hobart and William Smith transformed the physical campus, adding and expanding facilities while also increasing access and opportunity for students with an expansion of financial aid. Gearan made significant commitments to diversity and inclusion, propelled the Colleges' environmental efforts, and grew programming in civic engagement, career services, leadership, study abroad and student services.

The President's Forum

Gearan established a lecture series, the President's Forum, to bring national and international speakers to the University. Making use of personal contacts made during his thirty years in politics, speakers in the series have included Hillary Clinton, Robert Drinan, Sam Donaldson, Ralph Nader, Donna Shalala, Michael Dukakis, George Stephanopoulos, Barney Frank, George McGovern, Gloria Steinem, and Helen Thomas. "These speakers will enrich the campus life, while at the same time giving our visiting speakers a better sense of the dynamic community we have here," said Gearan, at the time of the series' creation.

Strategic Planning

At the close of his first year at Hobart and William Smith, Gearan began the development of a five-year strategic planning initiative called HWS 2005. He subsequently led the next two phases, HWS 2010 and HWS 2015, as well as Campaign for the Colleges, which raised more than $205 million to support facilities, endowment and annual giving.

Commitment to Academics

During Gearan's tenure and under the mentorship of faculty, HWS students earned numerous prestigious scholarships and fellowships, including:
 31 U.S. Fulbright Student Awards; in 2016, the Colleges were named among the top colleges and universities with the most recipients of 2015-16 U.S. Fulbright Student Awards, placing 13th in the nation. In two back-to-back record years, 14 members of the Classes of 2015 and 2016 have earned a Fulbright.
 1 Rhodes Scholarship
 9 Barry M. Goldwater Scholarships
 3 Princeton-in-Asia Fellowships
 1 Marshall Scholarship
 1 Gates-Cambridge Scholarship
 3 Morris K. Udall Undergraduate Scholarship
 6 NOAA Ernest F. Hollings Undergraduate Scholarships
 2 Charles B. Rangel International Affairs Fellowships

Accreditation from Middle States Commission

In 2014, the Colleges received an outstanding accreditation report from the Middle States Commission on Higher Education indicating that HWS fulfilled all standards and characteristics of excellence. Since the last Middle States reaccreditation, the team reported, Hobart and William Smith "have enhanced academic quality, expanded the faculty, improved campus resources and facilities, strengthened its competitive position, completed a successful $205 million campaign, contributed creatively to Geneva, developed signature programs in co-curricular learning, and nurtured its tradition and engagement of alums – all while weathering extremely well the national financial difficulties of the past six years," the report states.

Financial Health and Fundraising
 Between 1999 when Gearan took office and 2017, the HWS endowment doubled, growing from approximately $107 million to about $200 million in 2017. Gearan raised $317 million during that time.  
 Campaign for the Colleges, which concluded in 2012, raised more than $205 million. It was the largest fundraising effort in the Colleges' history, impacting every aspect of life at HWS including the academic program, student life, the endowment, annual giving and facilities.
 Thanks to the generosity of many, between 1999 and 2017, the Colleges created 168 new endowed scholarships, providing greater access to students.
 Recognizing that affording a college education can be daunting, since 1999 and thanks to the investment of donors, the Colleges' financial aid budget more than doubled, going from $19.6 million in 1999 to $42 million in 2017.
Facilities

During Gearan's tenure, more than 80 significant capital projects were completed including the construction of six new buildings:
  Bozzuto Boathouse (2003)
 Stern Hall (2003)
 Caird Hall (2005)
 de Cordova Hall (2005)
 The Katherine D. Elliott Studio Arts Center (2006)
 Gearan Center for the Performing Arts (2016)

Gearan Center for Performing Arts

In January 2016, the Colleges celebrated the grand opening of the Gearan Center, an extraordinary 65,000-square-foot facility that brings together music, dance, theatre and media and society in a unified academic space for the first time. Made possible thanks to the generosity of countless alumni, alumnae and friends of the Colleges, the facility is the largest capital project in the history of HWS. The Board of Trustees unanimously voted to name the building in honor of Mark D. and Mary Herlihy Gearan.

Geneva, N.Y. and Civic Engagement

A national expert on the intersection of higher education and service, Gearan made Geneva and civic engagement a priority of his presidency. Over the course of 18 years, the Colleges' Center for Community Engagement and Service Learning became a leader in the field promoting positive community change and enhanced student learning.
 In order to further deepen the Colleges' relationship with the City of Geneva, N.Y., Gearan created the Geneva Partnership, an initiative to increase community engagement and develop graduates who will be agents for change in their own communities. Hobart and William Smith made a number of investments in the City of Geneva including direct payments to assist the City budget, donations to non-profit organizations, and support of civic projects.
 As part of the Colleges' longstanding partnership with Geneva, in 2012, HWS established a 10-year, $1.7 million commitment to the City that assists in balancing its budget.
 Under Gearan's leadership, HWS partnered with the Geneva City School District (GCSD) in an initiative called Geneva 2020 which seeks to harness the resources of the Colleges and the Geneva community to provide assistance in key areas identified by GCSD as being critical to the future of Geneva's children. With the goal of ensuring that students in the local community have the skills necessary to graduate from high school and to effectively pursue college and careers, the program has helped move the local high school graduation rate from 70.7% in 2010 to 87.6% in 2016.
 The Colleges partnered with the City of Geneva in its successful bid to become a 2015 All-America City, a highly-selective honor awarded annually by the National Civic League to only 10 cities across the country.
 The HWS Day of Service, a tradition of nearly two decades, became Days of Service in 2008 when Gearan added new Days of Service throughout the year so that more students and local organizations could participate. All HWS students take part in community service.
 In 2011, the Colleges' were named Business of the Year by the Geneva Area Chamber of Commerce.
Environmental Sustainability

Environmental sustainability was a core value under Gearan's leadership. In 2007, Gearan signed the American College & University Presidents Climate Commitment, making HWS a charter member of a national effort to reduce emissions of the gases responsible for global warming. Since then, the Colleges have completed several comprehensive greenhouse gas inventories, cut energy consumption by more than 10%, and created robust recycling and composting programs. Today, 100% of the Colleges' electricity comes from wind.
 In 2016, HWS took another meaningful step toward climate neutrality with the construction of two local solar farms, which deliver 50% of the Colleges' power. 
 The Colleges continue to be named to Sierra magazine's annual list of the greenest colleges and universities, moving ahead 63 spots since first appearing on the list in 2009.
 Recognizing the importance of the health and vitality of the Finger Lakes to the region and the Colleges, Gearan led an effort to establish the Finger Lakes Institute to promote environmental research and education about the Finger Lakes and the surrounding environments. Established in 2004 with initial funding from former State Sen. Michael F. Nozzolio L.H.D.'07 and former U.S. Congressman James Walsh, Gearan's vision has become a preeminent source of research, education and community outreach for the Finger Lakes region.

The Salisbury Center for Career, Professional and Experiential Education
  The Salisbury Center for Career, Professional and Experiential Education has become a pioneer in collaborating with internal and external partners to facilitate a comprehensive and developmental process that assists students in realizing and fulfilling their career objectives.
 When Gearan began his presidency in 1999, the office had largely provided consultation on job searches and resume writing. The office now has more than 3000 student appointments each semester at which experienced counselors guide students through assessments, internships, job shadowing and networking, all intended to help students fully articulate, explore and realize their professional goals.
 The number of internships has grown from 70 in 2005 to more than 600 this year.
 In 2014, the HWS Guaranteed Internship Program further distinguished the Salisbury Center ensuring that all students who complete the Pathways Career Services program are guaranteed an internship or research opportunity. For summer internships that are unpaid, the Colleges provide a stipend.

Guidebooks and National Attention During Gearan's Tenure
 Money magazine (2016): HWS was named among the "50 Best Liberal Arts Colleges" for the second year in a row.
 Princeton Review (2015): The Colleges were named one of the nation's 50 best colleges and universities for providing students with outstanding outcomes in its "Colleges That Create Futures: 50 Schools That Launch Careers by Going Beyond the Classroom" guide.
 Forbes (2016): Thanks to record philanthropy from HWS alums, the Colleges were named among the nation's top colleges and universities with the best return on investment (ROI). Ranked No. 80, HWS made Forbes Grateful Grads Index for the third year in a row as part of its annual "America's Top Colleges" ranking.
 Kiplinger Personal Finance(2016): HWS was named to Kiplinger's list of 100 Best College Values.
 The Princeton Review's Colleges That Pay You Back (2016): Hobart and William Smith were named among the nation's top schools for delivering the best in education, affordability, career preparation and outcomes.
 Fiske Guide to Colleges (2017): Fiske noted: HWS is a place where students are "rewarded with small classes, caring faculty, and a place where tradition still matters."
 The Princeton Review's "Guide to 353 Green Colleges" (2015): recognized HWS as one of North America's most environmentally responsible schools. It was the fourth consecutive year the Colleges have been honored.
 Washington Monthly (2014): HWS was ranked 8th in the nation among liberal arts colleges for our dedication to service.

New York Times sexual assault story and Gearan's response 
A July 13, 2014 New York Times article detailed a case in which a Hobart and William Smith freshman reported a sexual assault by three students two weeks into her first year. Within two weeks the college's investigation cleared the two men accused, despite medical evidence, a corroborating witness to one of the incidents and discrepancies in the alleged perpetrators' accounts of the evening. The story also alleged the members of the disciplinary panel that heard the case were uninformed about sexual assault and frequently changed the subject rather than hear the victim's account of events. 

As president of HWS, Gearan issued a response on July 13, 2014, stating that "even though we believe we handled the circumstances fairly and within the constraints of the law, and that we made decisions based on the evidence, there is no sense of satisfaction other than the knowledge that we treated everyone with compassion, kindness and respect."  He went on to state that "HWS officials met with the Times reporter for two lengthy interviews and answered numerous questions via e-mail and phone, all in an effort to fully explain our approach and philosophy regarding sexual assault cases" and stated that "information that was provided to the Times reporter [was] largely missing from the article" and that transcripts of the hearings "were quoted out of context".

On July 16, 2014, he issued a second response stating that "A group of faculty, staff, students and alums are working on a thorough review of our processes for sexual misconduct cases".  In 2015, the Colleges significantly expanded its Office for Title IX Programs and Compliance. The office now includes a Title IX coordinator, Deputy Title IX Coordinator, and a Prevention and Education Coordinator, increasing its outreach to students and facilitating the timely resolution of cases.

Other activities and honors
Gearan is the recipient of 12 honorary degrees. Gearan serves on the boards of the National Association of Independent Colleges and Universities, the Points of Light Foundation, the Annapolis Group, the Corporation for National and Community Service and The Partnership of Public Service.

On April 28, 2003 the Washington Post reported that Gearan's re-appointment to the board of the Corporation for National and Community Service had been kicked back by the Bush White House. On November 23, 2004, Gearan was confirmed by the U.S. Senate to serve on the board of the Corporation for National and Community Service. On November 30, 2007 the Rochester Democrat and Chronicle reported that Gearan was confirmed on November 16 to another three-year term on the Board of Directors of the Corporation for National and Community Service.

An article by the Associated Press on September 17, 2004, said that in the event of a Kerry win in the 2004 campaign for the presidency, Gearan would be a possible nominee for the post of Secretary of the Interior.

References

External links
Biography from Hobart & William Smith Colleges Site
Biography from Peace Corps website

|-

1956 births
Presidents of Hobart and William Smith Colleges
Georgetown University Law Center alumni
Harvard College alumni
Living people
Massachusetts Democrats
Peace Corps directors
People from Gardner, Massachusetts
Politicians from Geneva, New York
White House Deputy Chiefs of Staff
White House Communications Directors
Clinton administration personnel